Canoe Lake is a V-shaped lake in Kenora District, Ontario, Canada, just east of the border with Manitoba and  south of Highway 17. There are portages from it to both Shoal Lake and Lake of the Woods.

See also
List of lakes in Ontario

References

Lakes of Kenora District